Tammy Galera Takagi (born 11 March 1991) is a diver from Brazil. 

She competed at the 2015 World Aquatics Championships  in the women's synchronized 3 metre springboard, and the 2016 Summer Olympics.

See also
 Brazil at the 2015 World Aquatics Championships

Notes

References

External links
 
 
 Zimbio
 NBC
 Getty Images

1991 births
Living people
Brazilian female divers
Olympic divers of Brazil
Divers at the 2016 Summer Olympics
South American Games gold medalists for Brazil
South American Games bronze medalists for Brazil
South American Games medalists in diving
Competitors at the 2010 South American Games
Place of birth missing (living people)
21st-century Brazilian women